Web Open Font Format is a font format for use in web pages.

WOFF, or Woff, may also refer to:

 Wings Over Flanders Fields, a 2013 combat flight simulation video game set in World War I
 World of Final Fantasy, a 2016 video game
 Jim Woff, member of the Australian rock band Crow
 a fictional species in the Hilda graphic novel series and TV series